Caitlynne Medrek (born November 19, 1989) is an international, award winning Canadian actress. She spent the first half of her career living and working in professional theatre around Canada, but has since set her sights on creating a cinematic career by performing in Film and Television.  A Canadian College of Performing Arts alumna, Medrek is a true triple threat.  She is best known for her roles in Heartland (Seasons 15 & 16) as Ms. Clarissa, Fargo, Season 3 as Grace Stussy, and Claire in the award-winning series, Out with Dad. She has had an incredible voice acting career with notable roles like Dawn in Total Drama: Revenge of the Island, Mikoto in My-HiME, Miu Matsuoka in Strawberry Marshmallow, Pan in Dragon Ball GT. Her latest mainstream voice work include: Haunted House, Secrets of the Ghost Ball (Netflix), Kongsuni (Netflix), Cardfight!! Vanguard, Arthur, and Gintama. She can be seen in the final season of Hell on Wheels, Season 2 of Wynonna Earp, Season 3 of Fargo as Grace Stussy, Season 3 of The Detour and recently, Seasons 15 and 16 of Heartland, Season 2 of Tribal and Season 2 of Yellowjackets. Caitlynne is also in production for two Feature Films set for 2023 release. 

She is also known in the world of web series for playing Claire Daniels, one of the main roles of many-times-awarded LGBT webseries, Out with Dad, for which she received nominations and awards.

Background
Born on November 19, 1989, in Calgary, Alberta to a father of Polish descent and a mother of Ukrainian descent, Medrek started performing at ten years of age doing community theatre, and quickly moved into the professional theatre world at age twelve.  She kept up dance skills in a variety of styles including Ukrainian dance and competed at various festivals throughout the province in solo, duet and trio events. She was a member of the Young Canadians of the Calgary Stampede and at age 15 competing in Calgary's "Youth Talent Showdown" competition at the Calgary Stampede where she won 2nd runner-up.  That same year she placed first at the Kiwanis Music Festival and went on to win first place in Provincials for Musical Theatre in Edmonton.

Career
In 2006, she was cast as Amber in the Rod Lurie-directed film Resurrecting the Champ. Medrek has voiced characters in a variety of anime works, often with the Calgary-based Blue Water Studios and Ocean Productions.  In Summer 2007, she was a member of the Charlottetown Festival Young Company Training Program and a cast member of Alberta Fusion. She graduated in April 2008 from the Canadian College of Performing Arts (CCPA), where she received the Arnold Spohr Scholarship.

On leaving college, she worked regional theatre contracts until she decided to move to Toronto, Ontario.

In December 2008, she was seen in Saskatoon-based Persephone Theatre's A Christmas Carol as 'Want'. She spent July 2009 performing with Globus Theatre, in Bobcaygeon, Ontario, playing the lead in Neil Simon's I Ought To Be in Pictures, later that year appearing in the title role in Canada's debut of the off-Broadway show Pinkalicious the Musical. Caitlynne performed the role of Pinkalicious for 2 years. 

In January 2010, she starred as 'Anne Frank' in The Diary of Anne Frank, and completed the run of "The 25th Annual Putnam County Spelling Bee" as "Logainne Schwarzy" with Fallen Rock Productions, in the spring. In the summer she went on to play Charlie Brown's sister, Sally, in  "Dog Sees God".  While maintaining her theatre career, Medrek has been cast as a regular in the animated television series Total Drama: Revenge of the Island as a contestant named Dawn, broadcast on Fresh TV and Teletoon, as a guest in the animated television series Skatoony and in the highly acclaimed web series, Out With Dad and Clutch, Season 2.  In 2013 she starred in Blood Riders: the Devil Rides with Us which premiered at the Blood in the Snow Film Festival in Toronto, Ontario.

Caitlynne decided to move back to Alberta in 2014 to seek out future theatre and film opportunities in her home Province.  Since the fall of 2014, she was cast as "Hope" in "Urinetown", as "Kensington" in "Becky's New Car", as "Violet Beauregard" in "Willy Wonka and the Chocolate Factory", as "Betty Parris" in Theatre Calgary's "The Crucible", as "Belle" in Disenchanted and "Gertrude McFuzz" in "Seussical, the Musical".  She has taken an interest in directing and assistant directed "Hana's Suitcase" with StoryBook Theatre and made her directing debut in the fall of 2017 with "Pinkalicious" for StoryBook Theatre.  In the summer of 2015, she was cast in Episode 10 of AMC's highly acclaimed "Hell on Wheels".  Since 2015, her film career has excelled further, along with more voiced anime projects for Netflix, a role on Season 2 of Wynonna Earp, a principal role in Season 3 of The Detour and a recurring role on Season 3 on the highly acclaimed series Fargo, as Grace Stussy.

In 2016, she started her own Princess Party Company named YYC Princess which has become Calgary's first and foremost princess company. In this realm, she has become a motivational speaker in following your dreams and recently spoke in Calgary at Pechakucha and is a frequent guest speaker at Calgary Comic Expo.  She is a weekly actor in Dirty Laundry, Calgary's longest running 100% improvised weekly soap opera.

2019 brought the role of Mrs. Wilkinson to Caitlynne in Theatre Calgary's production of Billy Elliot the Musical.  Caitlynne was recently awarded the Betty Mitchell Award for Best Leading Actress in a Musical for her role in Billy Elliot.

In 2020, Caitlynne was named by Avenue Magazine in Calgary as one of Calgary's own "Top 40 under 40".  She was also named as Broadway World's "Performer of the Decade" for her role in Theatre Calgary's production of Billy Elliot the Musical.

Anime series
 - Gaeun Lee
Strawberry Marshmallow – Miu Matsuoka
D.I.C.E. – Puffy Angel
Doki Doki School Hours – Chinatsu Nakayama, Soccer Ball
My-HiME – Mikoto Minagi
My-Otome – Mikoto the Cat Goddess
Flame of Recca – Ganko Morikawa/Primela, Young Fuuko
Future Card Buddyfight - Ku Teito
Gintama° - Soyo Tokugawa
Kiznaiver - Chidori Takashiro
Mobile Suit Zeta Gundam – Qum, Cheimin Noah
Dragon Ball GT – Pan (Canadian dub), Young Guide
Tomato Twins – Ti Ann
Cardfight!! Vanguard G - Rin Hashima
Kongsuni - Eve

Video games
Dynasty Warriors: Gundam – Elpeo Puru
Dynasty Warriors: Gundam 2 – Elpeo Puru
Mega Man X: Command Mission – Cinnamon

Radio roles
Conversations with my Neighbour's Pitbull – Ellen
Discovery Financial – Teen Girl

Film and television roles
Resurrecting the Champ – Amber, the babysitter (deleted scenes)
Iota – Child Narrator, Lead
Second Coming in the 2nd Grade – Christina
Total Drama: Revenge of the Island - Dawn
Out with Dad - Claire Daniels
Clutch (web series) - Lex
Skatoony - Dawn
Blood Riders: the Devil Rides with Us
Bibi Blocksberg – Theme song Vocal
Arthur - Kaylie Lamott
Hell on Wheels - Season 5, Episode 10
Fargo - Season 3
Wynonna Earp - Season 2
The Detour - Season 3
Heartland - Seasons 15 & 16
Tribal - Season 2

Theater roles
Sound of Music – Stage West – Marta Von Trapp
A Christmas Carol – Theatre Calgary – Mary Cratchit
Picking Up Chekhov – Alberta Theatre Projects – The Kid
Oklahoma! – Front Row Centre – Ado Annie
Alberta Fusion – The Confederation Centre's Young Company/Charlottetown Festival
Oh Canada Eh! Dinner Theatre – Oh Canada Eh! – Rose Marie/ Featured Singer Dancer
A Christmas Carol – Persephone Theatre – Want
I Ought to Be in Pictures – Globus Theatre – Libby Tucker
Pinkalicious, the Musical – Vital Theatre Company – Pinkalicious
The Diary of Anne Frank – Encore Entertainment – Anne Frank
Becky's New Car - Alberta Theatre Projects – Kensington
The Crucible - Theatre Calgary - Betty Parris
Disenchanted - Cappuccino Theatre - Belle
Seussical, the Musical - Storybook Theatre - Gertrude McFuzz
Billy Elliot the Musical - Theatre Calgary - Mrs. Wilkinson

Nominations and awards 
Caitlynne Medrek has received the following nominations and awards:

2013 
4th Indie Soap Awards (2013) (1 only winner in a category)
 Award : Best Breakthrough Performance for " Out with Dad "

2014 
5th Indie Soap Awards (2014) (1 only winner in a category)
 Nominations: Best Supporting Actress (Drama)  for " Out with Dad " (1st nom.)

LA Web Series Festival 2014 (multiple prizes in the same category)
 Award : Outstanding Supporting Actress in a Drama Series for " Out with Dad "

2015 
6th Indie Soap Awards (2015) (1 only winner in a category)
 Nominations: Best Supporting Actress (Drama) for " Out with Dad " (2nd nom.)

2020 
Top 40 Under 40<ref name="Avenue Magazine"

2021 
Broadway World - Regional Awards (2021)(1 only winner in a category)
 Award: Performer of the Decade (Musical or Comedy) for " Billy Elliot "

References

External links

Caitlynne Medrek at the CrystalAcids Anime Voice Actor Database
Casting Workbook Profile

1989 births
Living people
Actresses from Calgary
Canadian child actresses
Canadian child singers
Canadian women singers
Canadian film actresses
Canadian mezzo-sopranos
Canadian musical theatre actresses
Canadian people of Polish descent
Canadian people of Ukrainian descent
Canadian stage actresses
Canadian voice actresses
Canadian web series actresses
Musicians from Calgary
21st-century Canadian actresses